Sophie of Brandenburg-Ansbach (1614–1646) was a German noblewoman of the house of Brandenburg-Ansbach.

Life
She was the eldest child of Sophie of Solms-Laubach and her husband Joachim Ernst, Margrave of Brandenburg-Ansbach. In Ansbach on 8 December 1641, she married Erdmann August, Hereditary Prince of Brandenburg-Bayreuth - since his father and her father were brothers, they were first cousins. Sophie and Erdmann August had only one child, Christian Ernst (b. Bayreuth, 6 August 1644 - d. Erlangen, 20 May 1712), who became Margrave of Brandenburg-Bayreuth.

Sources
 

1614 births
1646 deaths
House of Hohenzollern
Daughters of monarchs